Aleksandr Klinitchenko is a Ukrainian sprint canoer who competed in the mid-1990s. He won a bronze medal in the C-4 1000 m event at the 1993 ICF Canoe Sprint World Championships in Copenhagen.

References

Living people
Ukrainian male canoeists
Year of birth missing (living people)
ICF Canoe Sprint World Championships medalists in Canadian
20th-century Ukrainian people